Agramonte is a surname. Notable people with the surname include:

 Juan de Agramonte, 16th-century Spanish sailor
 Roberto Agramonte, Cuban revolutionary
 Juan Carlos Robinson Agramonte, Cuban politician
 Ignacio Agramonte (1841–1873), Cuban politician
 Aristides Agramonte (1868–1931), American physician

See also
Agramonte (Jagüey Grande), Cuban village of Matanzas Province